String Quartet No. 5 ("Quarteto popular no. 1") is the fifth of seventeen works in the genre by the Brazilian composer Heitor Villa-Lobos, written in 1931. A performance lasts approximately 17 minutes.

History
Villa-Lobos composed his Fifth Quartet in São Paulo in 1931. The manuscript bears a dedication to  the federally appointed Governor (Interventor) of the State of São Paulo from 26 November 1930 to 25 July 1931, though his name does not appear in the published score. The circumstances of the quartet's first performance are not recorded.

The Quarteto popular is the first of a pair of quartets written in the 1930s, and marks a return by Villa-Lobos to the string quartet after a hiatus of fourteen years. Its composition also coincides with the composer's return to Brazil after a lengthy period spent mainly in Paris, and its marked turn to nationalism is associated with the political programme of the Getulio Vargas regime. The subtitle, "Quarteto popular", likely refers to the use of actual popular Brazilian melodies. Villa-Lobos himself declared that this quartet is among his weaker compositions.

Analysis
This quartet, like all of Villa-Lobos's quartets except the first, consists of four movements:
 Poco andantino 
 Vivo e energico 
 Andantino – tempo giusto e ben ritmato 
 Allegro

The Fifth Quartet is unusual in Villa-Lobos's works in this genre for using genuine folk material, albeit in modified form.

Over the course of the first movement the tempo changes many times, ranging from Lento to Presto. The long Lento section in b. 90 to  136 is characterised by lyrical melodic writing in the first violin accompanied by a complex rhythmic pattern in the other instruments.

The second movement's predominantly fast tempo is also interrupted after eleven bars by a Lento section featuring double stops in all four instruments and sul ponticello tremolo effects in the two violins. After eight bars, the opening tempo is resumed for the remainder of the movement, save for a concluding Molto lento coda of five bars.

The third movement inverts the relationship found in the first two movements by interrupting a predominantly slow tempo after only two bars with a fast and light-hearted section (Tempo giusto e ben ritmato) of sufficient length to make the opening material sound merely like a slow introduction. After twenty-three bars, however, a slow tempo (Adagio) is resumed, eventually giving way to the original Andantino. The short opening Andantino motive, played in unison, is  one that Villa-Lobos often uses to suggest Indian music.

The finale, in contrast to the earlier movements, maintains a steady Allegro tempo throughout. After a brief introduction in parallel fourths, the main theme from the first movement returns, at double its original tempo but in the same key. A series of children's themes taken from Villa-Lobos's collection, Guia prático,  provides the substance for the rest of the movement. The central section is based on the song "O Bastão ou mia gato" (The Stick or a Cat's Meow), played in harmonics in all four instruments, after which the opening section, minus the introduction, is repeated to create an ABA ternary form.

Discography
In chronological order, by date of recording.
 Heitor Villa-Lobos: Brazilian Quartet No. 5.  Quarteto Carioca (Borgeth [i.e. Oscar Borgerth?], first violin; Barraca, second violin; Orlando, viola; Iberé [i.e. Iberê Gomes Grosso?], cello). 2 sound discs: analog, 78 rpm, monaural, 12 in. Victor 11212, 11213. Red Seal Record. Camden, N.J.: Victor, [193-?]
 Heitor Villa-Lobos: Quarteto de cordas No. 1; Quarteto de cordas no. 5. Quarteto Bessler. LP recording, 1 disc: 33⅓ rpm, stereo, 12 in. EMI Angel 31C 051 422878. Brazil: EMI Angel, 1980.
 Villa-Lobos: Quatuors a Cordes Nos. 4/5/6. Quatuor Bessler-Reis (Bernardo Bessler, Michel Bessler, violins; Marie-Christine Springuel, viola; Alceu Reis, cello). Recorded at Studios Master in Rio de Janeiro, June–August 1987. CD recording, 1 disc: digital, 12 cm, stereo. Le Chant du Monde LDC 278 901. France: [S.n.], 1988.
 Also issued as part of Villa-Lobos: Os 17 quartetos de cordas / The 17 String Quartets. Quarteto Bessler-Reis and Quarteto Amazônia. CD recording, 6 sound discs: digital, 12 cm, stereo. Kuarup Discos KCX-1001 (KCD 045, M-KCD-034, KCD 080/1, KCD-051, KCD 042). Rio de Janeiro: Kuarup Discos, 1996.
 Heitor Villa-Lobos: String Quartets Nos. 5, 9 and 12. Danubius Quartet (Gyöngyvér Oláh and Adél Miklós, violins; Cecilia Bodolai, viola; Ilona Ribli, cello). Recorded at the Rottenbiller Street Studio in Budapest from 18 to 23 May 1992. CD recording, 1 disc: digital, 12 cm, stereo. Marco Polo 8.223392. A co-production with Records International. Germany: HH International, Ltd., 1993.
 Villa-Lobos: String Quartets, Volume 5. Quartets Nos. 5, 10, 13. Cuarteto Latinoamericano (Saúl Bitrán, Arón Bitrán, violins; Javier Montiel, viola; Alvaro Bitrán, cello). Recorded at the Sala Blas Galindo of the Centro Nacional de las Artes in Mexico City, 24–28 January 2000. Music of Latin American Masters. CD recording, 1 disc: digital, 12 cm, stereo. Dorian DOR-93211. Troy, NY: Dorian Recordings, 2000.
 Reissued as part of Heitor Villa-Lobos: The Complete String Quartets. 6 CDs + 1 DVD with a performance of Quartet No. 1 and interview with the Cuarteto Latinoamericano. Dorian Sono Luminus. DSL-90904. Winchester, VA: Sono Luminus, 2009.
 Also reissued (without the DVD) on Brilliant Classics 6634.

Filmography
 Villa-Lobos: A integral dos quartetos de cordas. Quarteto Radamés Gnattali (Carla Rincón, Francisco Roa, violins; Fernando Thebaldi, viola; Hugo Pilger, cello); presented by Turibio Santos. Recorded from June 2010 to September 2011 at the Palácio do Catete, Palácio das Laranjeiras, and the Theatro Municipal, Rio de Janeiro. DVD and Blu-ray (VIBD11111), 3 discs. Rio de Janeiro: Visom Digital, 2012.

References

Cited sources

Further reading
 Béhague, Gerard. 1979. Music in Latin America: An Introduction. New Jersey: Prentice-Hall.
 Béhaque, Gerard. 1994. Heitor Villa-Lobos: The Search for Brazil's Musical Soul. Austin: Institute of Latin American Studies, University of Texas at Austin.
 Béhague, Gerard. 2003. Villa-Lobos, Heitor: String Quartets, Cuarteto Latinoamericano. [review] Latin American Music Review / Revista de Música Latinoamericana 24, no. 2 (Autumn–Winter): 293–94.
 Estrella, Arnaldo. 1978. Os quartetos de cordas de Villa-Lobos, second edition. Rio de Janeiro: Museu Villa-Lobos, Ministério da Educação e Cultura.
 Gilman, Bruce. 1999. "Enigma de vanguardia", translated by Juan Arturo  Brennan. Pauta: Cuadernos de teoría y crítica musical 17, no. 69 (January–March): 29–34.
  Kraehenbuehl, David. 1957.  "George Rochberg: String Quartet, 1952. (Society for the Publication of American Music, 37th Season, 1956.) New York: Society for the Publication of American Music; distr.: Carl Fischer, 1957; Toch, Ernst. Dedication. For string quartet or string orchestra, with optional bass part. New York: Mills, 1957. Heitor Villa-Lobos: String Quartets, Nos. 4, 7, and 12. New York: Associated Music Publishers, 1956; Ernest Gold: String Quartet No. 1. (Society for the Publication of American Music, 37th Season, 1956.) New York: Society for the Publication of American Music; distr.: Carl Fischer, 1957".  Notes 15, no. 1 (December): 147.
 Macedo Ribeiro, Roberto. 2000. "A escrita contrapontística nos quartetos de cordas de Heitor Villa-Lobos". In Anais do I Colóquio de Pesquisa de Pós-Graduação, edited by Marisa Rezende and Mário Nogueira, 71–76. Rio de Janeiro: Universidade Federal do Rio de Janeiro (UFRJ) (Escola de Música).
 Villa-Lobos, sua obra: Programa de Ação Cultural. 1972. Second edition. Rio de Janeiro: MEC, DAC, Museu Villa-Lobos.
 Villa-Lobos, sua obra. 2009. Version 1.0. MinC / IBRAM, and the Museu Villa-Lobos. Based on the third edition, 1989.

String quartets by Heitor Villa-Lobos
1931 compositions
Music dedicated to nobility or royalty